Mara Santos García (born May 25, 1969 in Velilla del Río Carrión) is a Spanish marathon canoer who has competed since 1985 to 2012. Competing in Canoe Marathon World Championships, she has won five gold medals, two silvers and two bronzes. She holds the record for victories in the International Descent of the Sella, in Ribadesella (Asturias).

See also
 1999 Canoe Marathon European Championships

References

External links
 Profile of Mara Santos in Facebook

1969 births
People from Palencia
Sportspeople from the Province of Palencia
Living people
Spanish female canoeists
ICF Canoe Sprint World Championships medalists in Canadian
20th-century Spanish women